Acacia kenneallyi is a shrub or tree of the genus Acacia and the subgenus Plurinerves that is endemic to north western Australia.

Description
Like most species of Acacia it has phyllodes rather than true leaves. It blooms from May to June and produces yellow flowers.

Taxonomy
The species is closely related to Acacia spectra and Acacia latescens as well as Acacia orthotropica to which it is superficially dissimilar.

Distribution
It is native to an area in the Kimberely,  region of Western Australia where it is commonly situated in areas of sandstone or dolerite growing in skeletal sandy soils. It is mostly found on the Bonaparte Archipelago and parts of the nearby mainland and also off-shore including on Heywood Island and Bigge Island as a part of Eucalyptus woodland communities.

See also
 List of Acacia species

References

kenneallyi
Acacias of Western Australia
Taxa named by Bruce Maslin
Plants described in 1995
Taxa named by Richard Sumner Cowan